If I Were King is a 1920 American silent drama film produced by Fox Film Corporation, directed by J. Gordon Edwards, and starring William Farnum as François Villon with Fritz Leiber, Sr. and Betty Ross Clarke.

Cast
 William Farnum as François Villon
 Betty Ross Clarke as Katherine
 Fritz Leiber Sr. as Louis XI
 Walter Law as Thibault
 Henry Carvill as Triestan
 Claude Payton as Montigney
 V.V. Clogg as Toison D'Or
 Harold Clairmont as Noel
 Renita Johnson as Huguette
 Kathryn Chase as Elizabeth

Preservation status
A copy of the film is preserved in the Library of Congress.

See also
List of rediscovered films

References

External links

 
If I Were King at AllMovie
 If I Were King movie poster

1920 films
American silent feature films
Films directed by J. Gordon Edwards
Fox Film films
Films about François Villon
American black-and-white films
Films set in France
Films set in the 15th century
1920s rediscovered films
Cultural depictions of François Villon
1920s historical drama films
American historical drama films
Cultural depictions of Louis XI of France
Rediscovered American films
1920s American films
Silent American drama films